Gopal may refer to:
 Gopal (caste), a social community of Odisha in India
 Gopal (Krishna), the infant/child form of Lord Krishna
 Gopal Bansa, ancient Kingdom in Nepal
 The Gopalas, an early Gaudiya Vaishnava institution
 Gandhian Organisation for Peace and Liberty (GOPAL), an organization founded by Jayatirtha Dasa

People with the given name
 Gopal Ganesh Agarkar (1856–1895), Indian social reformer
 Gopal Balakrishnan (born 1966), American philosopher
 Gopal Baratham (1935–2002), Singaporean author and neurosurgeon
 Gopal Chandra Bhattacharya (1895–1981), Indian entomologist and naturalist
 Gopal Bose (1947–2018), Indian cricketer
 Gopal Gurunath Bewoor (1916–1989), Indian military officer and diplomat
 Gopal Bhar, Medieval Bengali jester
 Gopal Bhargava (born 1952), Indian politician
 Gopal Bhatnagar, Canadian surgeon
 Gopal Chakraborty (born 1936), Indian cricketer
 Gopal Singh Chauhan, Indian politician
 Gopal Chhotray (1916–2003), Indian playwright
 Gopal Singha Dev ( 1712–1748), king of the Mallabhum
 Gopal Singha Dev II ( 1809–1876), king of the Mallabhum
 Gopal Prasad Dubey (born 1957), Indian dancer
 Gopal Nilkanth Dandekar (1916–1998), Indian Marathi writer
 Gopal Hari Deshmukh (1823–1892), Indian activist, thinker, and social reformer
 Gopal Datt, Indian actor
 Gopal Ghose (1913–1980), Indian painter
 Gopal Krishna Gokhale (1866–1915), Indian politician
Gopal Gupta (computer scientist), Indian computer scientist
 Gopal Gupta (philosopher), Indian philosopher
 Gopal Gurung (1939–2016), Nepalese journalist, author, politician, and futurist
 Gopal Goyal Kanda (born 1965), Indian businessman and politician
 Gopal Khanna, Indian-American civil servant
 Gopal Swami Khetanchi (born 1958), Indian painter
 Gopal Kirati, Nepalese politician
 Gopal Krishna (born 1947), Indian radio astronomer
 Gopal Krishan (1926–2004), Indian musician
 Gopal Kundu (born 1959), Indian biologist
 Gopal Chandra Lamichhane (born 1974), Nepali film director
 Gopal Mayekar (1934–2021), Indian politician and Marathi writer
 Gopal Meena, Indian politician
 Gopal Menon (born 1974), Indian film director
 Gopal Mishra (1933–2009), Indian journalist and columnist
 Gopal Shankar Misra (1957–1999), Indian musician and music teacher
 Gopal Mittal (1906–1993), Indian Urdu poet, writer, critic and journalist
 Gopal Krishna Muhuri (died 2001), Bangladeshi academic administrator
 Gopal Krishna Nahak (1960–2001), Indian social entrepreneur
 Gopal Krishna Nayak (born 1960), Indian academic
 Gopal Singh Nepali (1911–1963), Indian Hindi poet
 Gopal Parajuli, Nepalese writer
 Gopal Parmar, Indian politician
 Gopal Prasad Parajuli (born 1953), Nepali judge
 Gopal Krishna Pillai (born 1949), Indian civil servant
 Gopal Purushottam Phadke (died 2009), Indian sports coach
 Gopal Poddar (born 1951), Indian businessman
 Gopal Prasad (born 1945), Indian-American mathematician
 Gopal R, Indian military officer
 Gopal Rai, Indian politician
 Gopal Rai (Nepalese politician) (died 2006), Nepalese politician
 Gopal Rajwani (died 2000) Indian politician and criminal
 Gopal Raju (1928–2008), Indian-American publisher, editor, journalist, businessman, and philanthropist
 Gopal Rath (1945–2016), Indian Odia poet
 Gopal Singh Rawat, Indian bureaucrat
 Gopal Prasad Rimal (1918–1973), Nepalese poet
 Gopal Saini (born 1954), Indian runner
 Gopal Krishna Sarangi, Indian economist
 Gopal Sharma (born 1960), Indian cricketer
 Gopal Prasad Sharma (born 1964), Indian artist
 Gopal Sharman (1935–2016), Indian playwright, composer, and writer
 Gopal Shetty, Indian politician
 Gopal Singh (politician) (1917–1990), Indian politician
 Gopal Narayan Singh, Indian politician
 Gopal Prasad Sinha, Indian neurologist and politician
 Gopal K. Singh (born 1976), Indian Hindi actor
 Gopal Das Shrestha (1930–1998), Nepali journalist
 Gopal Subramanium (born  1958), Indian lawyer
 Gopal Kalan Tandel (born 1953), Indian politician
 Gopal Jee Thakur (born 1969), Indian politician
 Gopal Vittal (born 1967), Indian business executive
 Gopal Prasad Vyas (1915–2005), Indian poet
 Gopal Baba Walangkar ( 1840–1900), Indian social reformer
 Gopal Yonzon (1943–1997), Nepalese singer

People with the surname
 Anand Gopal, American journalist
 Antonio Gopal (born 1947), Seychellois hurdler
 B. Gopal, Indian director
 Balasubramanian Gopal (born 1970), Indian biologist
 Dheerendra Gopal (died 2000), Indian  Kannada actor
 E. S. Raja Gopal (1936–2018), Indian physicist
 Geetha Narayanan Gopal (born 1989), Indian chess player
 K. Gopal, Indian politician
 K. Gopal (AIADMK politician) (born 1960), Indian politician
 Nakkeeran Gopal (born 1959), Indian journalist
 Narayan Gopal (1930–1990), Nepalese singer and composer
 P. K. Gopal, Indian social worker
 Priyamvada Gopal (born 1968), Indian-British English language academic
 Sarvepalli Gopal (1923–2002), Indian historian
 Ram Gopal (author) (born 1925), Indian writer and historian
 Ram Gopal (dancer) (1912–2003), Indian-British dancer
 Tilakam Gopal (born 1941), Indian volleyball player
 Vin Gopal (born 1985), American politician

See also
 Rajagopal
 Gopal Das (disambiguation)
 Gopal Krishna (disambiguation)